The 2017–18 season was Arsenal Women's Football Club's 32nd season of competitive football. They won the WSL Cup for the 5th time and finished Runner-Up to Chelsea for the FA Women's Cup. Arsenal finished 3rd in the Women's Super League, missing out on a spot in UEFA Women's Champions League by 1 point.

Joe Montemurro took over as Manager of Arsenal on 5 December 2017 after Pedro Martínez Losa had departed the club, one month into the season.

Squad information

Transfers and loans

Transfers in

Transfers out

Competitions

Women's Super League

League table

Results summary

Results by matchday

FA Cup

WSL Cup

Group stage 
Group One South

Knockout rounds

References

Arsenal W.F.C. seasons
Arsenal W.F.C.